Ali II ibn Hussein (24 November 1712 – 26 May 1782) was the fourth leader of the Husainid Dynasty and the ruler of Tunisia from 1759 until his death in 1782.

See also 
Moustapha Khodja
Muhammad al-Warghi
Rejeb Khaznadar

18th-century people from the Ottoman Empire
18th-century Tunisian people
1712 births
1782 deaths
Beys of Tunis
18th-century rulers in Africa
Tunisian royalty